The county of Gloucestershire is divided into seven districts. The districts of Gloucestershire are Gloucester, Tewkesbury, Cheltenham, Cotswold, Stroud, Forest of Dean, South Gloucestershire.

As there are 308 Grade I listed buildings in the county they have been split into separate lists for each district.

 Grade I listed buildings in Cheltenham
 Grade I listed buildings in Cotswold (district)
 Grade I listed buildings in Forest of Dean
 Grade I listed buildings in Gloucester
 Grade I listed buildings in South Gloucestershire
 Grade I listed buildings in Stroud (district)
 Grade I listed buildings in Tewkesbury (borough)

See also
 Grade II* listed buildings in Gloucestershire

 
Lists of Grade I listed buildings in Gloucestershire